Shiran Bisheh (also Romanized as Shīrān Bīsheh) is a village in Shurab Rural District, Veysian District, Dowreh County, Lorestan Province, Iran. At the 2006 census, its population was 76, in 18 families.

References 

Towns and villages in Dowreh County